The 1993 Virginia gubernatorial election was held on November 2, 1993. Barred from seeking a second term due to term limits restricting consecutive terms for Virginia Governor, incumbent Democratic Governor L. Douglas Wilder was replaced by Republican nominee and former U.S. Representative George Allen. Allen, who had defeated Clinton Miller for the Republican nomination, defeated longtime Attorney General of Virginia Mary Sue Terry, the Democratic nominee by 58.27% to 40.89%, which ended 12 consecutive years of Democratic control of the Governor's Mansion.

General election

Results

References

Gubernatorial
1993
Virginia
November 1993 events in the United States